Death flights are a form of extrajudicial killing practiced by military forces in possession of aircraft: victims are dropped to their death from airplanes or helicopters into oceans, large rivers or even mountains. Death flights have been carried out in a number of internal conflicts, including by France during the 1947 Malagasy Uprising and the 1957 Battle of Algiers, and by the junta dictatorship during the Argentine Dirty War between 1976 and 1983. During the Bougainville conflict PNGDF helicopters were used to dispose of corpses that had died under torture, and in some cases, still living victims.

Countries

Argentina 

During the 1976–1983 Argentine Dirty War, many thousands of people disappeared, clandestinely kidnapped by groups acting for the dictatorship. Human rights groups in Argentina often cite a figure of 30,000 disappeared; Amnesty International estimates 20,000. Many were killed in death flights, a practice initiated by Admiral Luis María Mendía, usually after detention and torture. Typically they were drugged into a stupor, loaded into aircraft, stripped, and dropped into the Río de la Plata or the Atlantic Ocean.

According to the testimony of Adolfo Scilingo, a former Argentine naval officer convicted in Spain in 2005 for crimes against humanity under the doctrine of universal jurisdiction, there were 180–200 death flights during 1977 and 1978. Scilingo confessed to participating in two such flights, during which 13 and 17 people were killed, respectively. Scilingo estimated that the Argentine Navy conducted the flights every Wednesday for two years, 1977 and 1978, killing 1,500 to 2,000 people.

Victims were sometimes made to dance for joy in celebration of the freedom they were told awaited them. In an earlier 1996 interview, Scilingo said, "They were played lively music and made to dance for joy, because they were going to be transferred to the south. ... After that, they were told they had to be vaccinated due to the transfer, and they were injected with Pentothal. And shortly after, they became really drowsy, and from there we loaded them onto trucks and headed off for the airfield." At the time, Scilingo said that the Argentine Navy was "still hiding what happened during the Dirty War".

In May 2010, Spain extradited pilot Julio Alberto Poch to Argentina. Born in 1952, Poch had been arrested in Valencia, Spain, on September 23, 2009, and was wanted in Argentina for his alleged participation as a pilot on the death flights. At his trial in February 2013, Poch denied that he had participated in the death flights, claiming everything he knew about them came from what he had read. After spending eight years in an Argentine jail, Poch was found not guilty by a court in Buenos Aires.

In April 2015, further arrests were made. It was reported that the death flights had started before 1976, and continued until 1983. To carry out the flights, a military unit, Batallón de Aviación del Ejército 601 (Army Air Battalion 601), was set up, with a commander, sub-commander, chief of staff, and officers from five companies. Soldiers who refused to take part, as well as others who acted as airfield guards and runway cleaners, testified they had seen live people and corpses loaded onto aircraft; after taking off, the planes returned empty. 

On 12 March 2016, Interpol, through the National Police of Colombia, arrested Juan Carlos Francisco Bossi in the city of Medellín. Also known as El doctor, Bossi is credited with activating the death flights during the Dirty War and wanted by Argentine authorities for taking part in death flights and forced disappearances of over 30,000 people. After his arrest, Bossi confessed to the Colombian authorities of being responsible for the deaths of 6,000 individuals.

A five-year trial (nicknamed the "ESMA mega-trial" or "Death Flights trial") of 54 former Argentine officials accused of running death flights and other crimes against humanity heard 830 witnesses and investigated the death of 789 victims. A verdict was reached on 29 November 2017: 29 defendants were sentenced to life in prison, six were acquitted, and the nineteen remaining defendants were sentenced to prison terms ranging from eight to 25 years.

Chile
Oregier Benavente, Augusto Pinochet's former personal helicopter pilot, has admitted that on numerous occasions he threw prisoners into the ocean or into the high peaks of the Andes.

Flights were also used to make bodies of already murdered dissidents disappear. One person's testimony described the procedure: corpses were put in gunny sacks; each sack was attached to a piece of rail using wire, and a second gunny sack put around both. The sacks were carried by pickup truck to helicopters that flew them to the coast of the Valparaíso region, where the bodies were thrown into the ocean. Secret police agent Osvaldo Romo confessed in a 1995 interview to having participated in death flights. Showing no remorse, he added, "Now, would it not be better throwing bodies into a volcano?"

In 2001, Chilean President Ricardo Lagos told the nation that during Pinochet's rule, 120 civilians had been tossed from helicopters into "the ocean, the lakes and the rivers of Chile".

Colombia 
During the Violencia (1948–1958), the Colombian military had dissenters thrown from airplanes above areas under the control of guerillas.

Guatemala 
The method was allegedly used during the Guatemalan genocide.  In one instance on 7 July 1975 – one month to the date after the assassination of José Luis Arenas – a contingent of uniformed army paratroopers arrived in Ixcán Grande and abducted 30 men.

France

French Algeria 

Death flights were used during the Algerian War by French paratroopers of the 10th Parachute Division under Jacques Massu during the Battle of Algiers (1957). After it was discovered that corpses sometimes resurfaced after being disposed in this manner, the executioners began attaching concrete blocks to their victims' feet. These victims came to be known as "Bigeard's shrimp", after one of the paratrooper commanders, Marcel Bigeard.

French Madagascar 
During the Malagasy Uprising of 1947 hundreds of Malagasy in Mananjary were killed, including 18 women and a group of prisoners thrown from aircraft.

Indonesian occupation of East Timor 
During its occupation of East Timor, Indonesian forces are alleged to have thrown suspected guerrillas and independence supporters from helicopters, many into lake Tasitolu, just west of the capital Dili. Other locations where detainees were thrown from aircraft include the rocky mountains between Dili and Aileu, in Dili Bay, and in the sea around Jaco Island near the eastern tip of the island. One of the most prominent victims was Venâncio Gomes da Silva, a former FRETILIN central committee member. According to Amnesty International, on July 14, 1980, he was put on a helicopter and flown south-east in the direction of Remexio; the helicopter returned without him 15 minutes later.

Papua New Guinea
During the Bougainville conflict which was fought in 1988–1998, Papua New Guinea Defence Force used the death flight method to dispose of the bodies of tortured rebels who died in Bougainville region. Some among the disposed victims were found out to be still alive when their bodies were disposed.

South Africa
By the late 1970s, the South African apartheid government started implementing death flight executions of rebel group fighters. To do this, the government created a special branch of the South African Defence Force called the Delta 40. Hundreds of ANC, PAC, and SWAPO affiliated activists and guerilla fighters were thrown into the Atlantic Ocean off the Namibian coast during the height of the South African Border War.

Aircraft were also used to dispose of the bodies of prisoners killed by other means beforehand. In one example, five members of a RENAMO rebel faction who assassinated Orlando Christina, the group's secretary general in April 1983. The suspects were first flown to the Caprivi strip where they were tried by the RENAMO war council, and shot. Their bodies were then wrapped in tarps, weighted, and dropped over the Atlantic, with a false flight plan drawn up.

Zaïre 
During the Mobutu era, an unknown number of people were extrajudicially executed by being dropped from helicopters into the Zaire River, the Kinsuka Rapids or Lake Kapolowe in the Shaba region.

Extraordinary rendition 
Scholars have compared the practicalities of the Argentine death flights to the US-led procedure of extraordinary rendition during the War on Terror, noting in particular how the two practices converge in many of their material and technological resources.

In popular culture
In The Gods Must Be Crazy (1980), soldiers threaten to throw two captured guerrillas out of a helicopter if they do not reveal information. The first guerrilla is pushed out blindfolded and quickly confesses in panic, not realizing the helicopter had already landed and that he has been tricked.
In the opening scene of The Dark Knight Rises (2012) by director Christopher Nolan, CIA agent Bill Wilson threatens to execute and dispose of a captive by throwing him out of a plane.
The 2009 video game Grand Theft Auto: The Ballad of Gay Tony contains a mission where the player are required to intimidate a blogger from high above the Statue of Happiness (the in-game version of Statue of Liberty) and throw him out from the flying helicopter.
In the TV series Narcos (2015–2017), Search Bloc agent Colonel Carillo throws two of Pablo Escobar's sicarios out of a military helicopter when they withhold information that could lead to the capture of the infamous drug kingpin.
The 2003 film Imagining Argentina depicts the murder of a dissident by Argentine soldiers who toss him from a helicopter while over the Atlantic Ocean, based on the real murders which were committed during the country's Dirty War.
In the 2006 film The Good Shepherd, a protagonist's wife, in reality a Soviet spy, is thrown out of a plane en route to her wedding.

See also
 Forced disappearance
 Operation Condor

References

External links
Argentina holds 'death flights' trial . – video report by Al Jazeera America. November 29, 2012.

Operation Condor
War crimes by type
War crimes in Algeria
Dirty War
Extrajudicial killings by type
Execution methods
South African Border War
Indonesian occupation of East Timor
Military aviation
Augusto Pinochet
French Madagascar
Apartheid in South Africa
Apartheid in South West Africa